Khorkovo is a rural locality (a village) and the administrative center of Lyavlenskoye Rural Settlement of Primorsky District, Arkhangelsk Oblast, Russia. The population was 341 as of 2010.

Geography 
Khorkovo is located 34 km southeast of Arkhangelsk (the district's administrative centre) by road. Novinki is the nearest rural locality.

References 

Rural localities in Primorsky District, Arkhangelsk Oblast